Francisco Bilbao Barquín (19 January 1823 – 9 February 1865) was a Chilean writer, philosopher and liberal politician.

Early life
Francisco Bilbao Barquin was born in Santiago on 9 January 1823 to Rafael Bilbao Beyne and Argentina Mercedes Barquín. His father, an opponent of Diego Portales, was exiled to Lima, Peru in 1829. In Peru he studied astronomy, sciences and music, and also practiced swimming and gymnastics. He returned to Santiago in 1839 and studied at the Instituto Nacional, taking courses including public law, constitutional law, Latin and philosophy, although he did not earn a degree. His teachers included Andrés Bello and José Victorino Lastarria.

Political career and thought

In 1844 he published his controversial article "The Chilean Sociability" ("La sociabilidad chilena"), which was condemned by Chilean authorities as "blasphemous and immoral, though not subversive." He moved to Paris in 1845, and was there during the 1848 uprising in Paris. He returned to Chile in 1850, the year he also founded the Society of Equality. In 1851 he led an unsuccessful insurrection against the government of Manuel Montt, after which he again had to move to Peru. He never returned to Chile.

In Lima, he joined Peruvian political life. In May 1855 he had to leave the country after being persecuted for criticizing the clergy. He went back to Europe, settling in Paris and Belgium.

In 1857, he returned to the Americas, specifically Argentina. He died in Buenos Aires in 1865, aged 42.

He was one of the first to advocate for the concept of Latin America, referring to South America, formulating the concept "as a direct echo of French anti-Pan-Slavism," in wake of the U.S.-Mexican War (1846–48), in which Mexico lost much of its northern territory to the U.S. and U.S. intervention in Nicaragua.  The idea of Latin America was to contest "'Yankee' individualism." For Bilbao, "Latin America" was not a geographical concept, since he excluded Brazil, then a monarchy with a black slave economy, and also Paraguay. He also excluded Mexico from his conception, since it had an entangled relationship with the United States, and in his view seemed united only in its opposition to the U.S.  Bilbao's thinking on democracy rejected delegated representation (such as a congress or parliament), and "thus advocated a sort of direct and constant self-representation in a Catholic community."  Bilbao opposed the Chilean war against the Araucanian or Mapuche peoples in southern Chile, who had never been conquered during the colonial era, with Bilbao supporting their autonomy.

Bilbao conceived of the Americas as having two main cultural contours. "America, in its two-fold nature as Saxon and Latin, witnesses not the contradiction of ideas, as in Europe, but the exclusivity of ideas.  America has crippled harmony. Harmony is individualism and sociability. The North embodies individualism; the South, sociability. The Saxon-Yankee is Protestant and federal; the Spanish American is Catholic and a centralizer... the Yankee is the centrifugal force; the American from the South is the centripetal force. Both are necessary for order to exist."

Works
"La sociabilidad chilena" in El Crepúsculo, June 1844
América en peligro. 1862
El evangelio americano 1864
Obras completas de Francisco Bilbao. Vol. 1. Buenos Aires, 1866.

See also
Latin America

References

Further reading
Donoso, Armando. "El pensamiento vivo de Bilbao." Santiago de Chile, Nascimiento (1940).
Lipp, Solomon. Three Chilean Thinkers, chapter 1. 1975.
Tenorio-Trillo, Mauricio. Latin America: The Allure and Power of an Idea. Chicago: University of Chicago Press 2017.
Varona, Alberto J. Francisco Bilbao, revolucionario de América. 1973.

1823 births
1865 deaths
Liberal Party (Chile, 1849) politicians
Instituto Nacional General José Miguel Carrera alumni
People of the 1851 Chilean Revolution
Politicians from Santiago